Yvon Barrette (born September 16, 1946) is a Canadian actor from Alma, Quebec. He is best known for his portrayal of goaltender Denis Lemieux in 1977's Slap Shot.

Barrette trained at the National Theatre School of Canada but left in 1969 before graduation due to disagreement over the notion of creation the School had toward Quebec theatre, along with classmates Pierre Curzi, Paule Baillargeon and Gilbert Sicotte.

Filmography

References

External links

French Quebecers
Living people
People from Alma, Quebec
20th-century Canadian male actors
21st-century Canadian male actors
Canadian male film actors
Canadian male television actors
Male actors from Quebec
National Theatre School of Canada alumni
1946 births